The Yu Da Wei Xian Sheng Memorial Museum is a war memorial museum in Zhongzheng Park, Jinhu Township, Kinmen County, Taiwan.

Architecture
The museum building was constructed with grey bricks and green roof tiles.

Exhibitions
The museum exhibits artifacts from Yu during the Second Taiwan Strait Crisis.

See also
 List of museums in Taiwan

References

Jinhu Township
Museums with year of establishment missing
Military and war museums in Taiwan
Museums in Kinmen County